Yandong is a town in Bama Yao Autonomous County, Guangxi Zhuang Autonomous Region, China.

Administrative division
As of 2017, the town is divided into twelve villages: 
 Longjia
 Jiaole
 Longfeng
 Longtian
 Tonghe
 Laiman
 Yandong
 Longwei
 Xinli
 Hongwan
 Zimao
 Yanting

History
In March 2016 it was upgraded to a town.

Geography
The town lies in the southern Bama Yao Autonomous County at its border with the counties of Tiandong and Tianyang. It borders the towns of Jiazhuan and Bama in the north, Natao Township in the east, Tianyang County in the southwest, Tiandong County in the southeast, and Suolue Township in the west.

The Lingxi Stream and Chedou Stream flow through the town.

Economy
The town's economy is based on nearby mineral resources and agricultural resources. The region abounds with gold, copper and antimony. The main food crops are rice, corn and cassava. Native products include tea-oil tree and Bama miniature pig.

Transport
The National Highway G323 passes across the township.

References

Bibliography
 

Towns of Hechi
Divisions of Bama Yao Autonomous County